Liang Kai is a crater on Mercury. It has a diameter of 140 kilometers. Its name was adopted by the International Astronomical Union in 1979. Liang Kai is named for the Chinese artist Liang Kai, who lived from 1140 to 1210.

To the southwest of Liang Kai is Wen Tianxiang crater.  To the south is Dostoevskij crater.  To the north is Gainsborough crater.

References

Impact craters on Mercury